This list of University of Florida alumni includes current students, former students, and graduates of the University of Florida in Gainesville, Florida. Honorary degree recipients can be found on the List of University of Florida honorary degree recipients, and notable administration, faculty, and staff are found on the List of University of Florida faculty and administrators.

Engineering, science, and mathematics

 Mark Adler, researcher, known for his work in data compression, and creator of zlib and gzip
 James Allchin, developed Microsoft operating systems, former executive
 Miguel Altieri, agroecologist at the University of California, Berkeley
 John D. Anderson, curator of aerodynamics at the National Air and Space Museum
 John Vincent Atanasoff, inventor of the first automatic electronic digital computer
 C. D. Atkins, co-creator of frozen orange juice concentrate
 Marc Baldus, physicist and expert in solid-state NMR spectroscopy
 Rodney J. Bartlett, chemist, Guggenheim Fellow
 Marston Bates, zoologist and fellow with the American Academy of Arts and Sciences
 Sidney W. Bijou, developmental psychologist
 George F. Bond, physician, father of saturation diving
 Karen Ramey Burns, forensic anthropologist, Fulbright Scholar
 Brian Caffo, winner of the Presidential Early Career Award for Scientists and Engineers
 Berry L. Cannon, aquanaut
 Archie Carr, zoologist, conservationist, and founder of the Caribbean Conservation Corporation
 Marjorie Harris Carr, pioneer in the American Conservation Movement
 Amitava Chattopadhyay, Professor in Corporate Innovation
 Jack Clemons, aerospace engineer and air and space industry professional
 Paul Cootner, financial economist
 Robert Costanza, ecological economist, Gund Professor of Ecological economics and Director of the Gund Institute for Ecological Economics at the University of Vermont
 Thomas R. Cundari, Director of the Center for Advanced Scientific Computing and Modeling
 Thomas Des Jean, anthropologist
 Nils J. Diaz, former chairman of the Nuclear Regulatory Commission
 Jonathan F. Earle, engineer, received the Presidential Award for Excellence in Science, Mathematics and Engineering Mentoring
 G. B. Edwards, taxonomic entomologist specializing primarily in spiders
 John F. Eisenberg, zoologist
 David Ehrenfeld, biologist and author
 Wesley R. Elsberry, marine biologist
 Philip Don Estridge, led development of the original IBM Personal Computer (PC), known as "father of the IBM PC"
 Manuel Fernandez, entrepreneur, guiding force behind the Gavilan SC, the first laptop computer
 Fred Gage, researcher of Alzheimer's disease and the spinal cord
 Jesse James Garrett, experience designer, who coined the term Ajax
 Jürgen Gauß, German theoretical chemist
 Robert Gentry, nuclear physicist and creationist advocate
 John W. Griffin, archaeologist, researcher, administrator, and author
 Keith E. Gubbins, member of the National Academy of Engineering in the chemistry section
 Herbert Gursky, former superintendent of the Naval Research Laboratory's Space Science Division
 Kelsie Harder, onomastician
 Steven Hebert, nephrologist
 Richard Highton, zoologist, current professor emeritus of biology at the University of Maryland
 Shere Hite, sex educator and feminist
 Horton H. Hobbs Jr., carcinologist, and former head curator of the United States National Museum
 James Hollan, cognitive scientist, professor at University of California, San Diego
 Nicholas Honerkamp, archaeologist
 George Kauffman, former professor emeritus of chemistry, Guggenheim Fellow
 Jerold Kemp, researcher in the field of Instructional Design
 Pramod Khargonekar, former dean of the University of Florida College of Engineering, control system theorist
 Thomas Kilduff, neuroscientist and the director of SRI International's Center for Neuroscience
 Bruce C. Kone, former dean of the University of Florida College of Medicine
 Martin Kreitman, geneticist, professor at the University of Chicago
 Kenney Krysko, herpetologist
 Thomas Des Jean, anthropologist
 Alan M. Jones, cell biologist, Kenan Distinguished Professor, University of North Carolina at Chapel Hill
 Capers Jones, software engineer
 Joseph C. Joyce, current executive Vice President for the Institute of Food and Agricultural Sciences
 Reynol Junco, psychologist and social media researcher, fellow at Harvard University
 K Ullas Karanth, Indian zoologist
 Seymour London, physician, and inventor of the first automatic blood pressure monitor
 Ira Longini, biostatistician and infectious disease epidemiologist
 Robert Love, author, speaker, and open source software developer
 Louis G. MacDowell, co-creator of frozen orange juice concentrate
 Ron Magill, wildlife expert, photographer and communications director for the regional Miami-Dade Zoological Park and Gardens
 Chris Malachowsky, computer scientist and co-founder of NVIDIA
 M. Cristina Marchetti, physicist, professor at University of California, Santa Barbara
 Preston McAfee, current vice president for Yahoo! Research
 Edwin H. McConkey, biologist who studies evolution, current Professor Emeritus at the University of Colorado
 Jerald Milanich, anthropologist and archaeologist
 William J. Mitsch, ecologist
 Lee Ann Newsom, anthropologist, and MacArthur Fellow
 Nandini Nimbkar, current president of the Nimbkar Agricultural Research Institute in India
 Carole C. Noon, primatologist, founder of Save the Chimps
 Jerald S. Paul, former Deputy Administrator for the National Nuclear Security Administration
 Maryly Van Leer Peck, first woman to receive an M.S. and a PhD in Chemical Engineering at University of Florida, president at Polk Community College
 Gary John Previts, accountant, Professor of Leadership and Enterprise Development 
 David Price, anthropologist
 Peter Pritchard, zoologist
 Anil K. Rajvanshi, mechanical engineer, and current Director of the Nimbkar Agricultural Research Institute in India
 K. R. Rao, electrical engineer and co-inventor of the Discrete cosine transform
 Michael Reynolds, astronomer
 Lesa Roe, current Chancellor of the University of North Texas System, and former director of the NASA's Langley Research Center in Hampton, Virginia
 Douglas A. Rossman, herpetologist
 Michael Ryschkewitsch, former chief engineer for NASA
 Melvin Sabshin, former Medical Director of the American Psychiatric Association
 Stephanie Moulton Sarkis, psychotherapist and author
 Samuel Sears, psychologist
 Dana Shires, medical researcher, member of the team that developed Gatorade
 Aseem Shukla, professor of urology at University of Pennsylvania and co-founder of Hindu American Foundation
 Stephen C. Sillett, botanist
 Robert S. Singleton, engineer, inventor, scientist, teacher of magnetics and computing
 Sung Won Sohn, Korean American economist
 Eduardo Sontag, Argentine mathematician
 Jeffrey Spieler, current director of research for USAID
 Lewis Stadler, geneticist
 David Steadman, museum curator
 Will Steffen, executive director of the ANU Climate Change Institute
 Gilbert Stork, creator of the Stork enamine alkylation, professor emeritus of chemistry at Columbia University
 Ashutosh Tewari, Indian oncologist and urologist
 Michael Thomas, entomologist
 James Thompson, former director of the NASA Marshall Space Flight Center
 Wolfgang A. Tomé, physicist
 Eva Vertes, Alzheimer's and cancer researcher
 Michael Warren, forensic anthropologist

Nobel Prize laureates

 Robert Grubbs, winner of the Nobel Prize for Chemistry in 2005 for his work in the field of olefin metathesis
 Marshall Nirenberg, winner of the Nobel Prize for Physiology/Medicine in 1968 for describing the genetic code and how it operates in protein synthesis

Astronauts

 Andrew M. Allen, former NASA astronaut, and former U.S. Marine Corps naval aviator
 William Frederick Fisher, former NASA astronaut, and current medical doctor
 Kevin A. Ford, former NASA astronaut pilot
 Fitzhugh L. Fulton, research pilot at NASA's Dryden Flight Research Center
 Ronald J. Garan, NASA astronaut, and former U.S. Air Force pilot
 Donald L. Mallick, former NASA research pilot
 Bill Nelson, former U.S. Senator and former U.S. Representative; Space Shuttle payload specialist astronaut (non-NASA Astronaut Corps); part of NASA initiative for placing U.S. congressional members in space until initiative suspended following Columbia accident
 Ronald A. Parise, former NASA astronaut
 Norman Thagard, former NASA astronaut, and current professor of engineering at Florida State University

Presidents of universities and colleges

 Byong Man Ahn, former president of Hankuk University of Foreign Studies in Seoul, Korea, and former Ministry of Education, Science and Technology for South Korea
 M. S. Ananth, former director of Indian Institute of Technology Madras
 George F. Baughman, founding president of New College of Florida
 P. George Benson, current president of the College of Charleston
 Thomas G. Carpenter, former president of Memphis State University and University of North Florida
 Marshall Criser, former president of University of Florida and former chairman of Scripps Florida
 Harold B. Crosby, former president of University of West Florida and Florida International University
 Gay Culverhouse, former president of Notre Dame College and president of the Tampa Bay Buccaneers
 Sandy D'Alemberte, former president of Florida State University and the American Bar Association
 John Delaney, former president of the University of North Florida, former chancellor of the State University System of Florida
 Donald Eastman, current president of Eckerd College
 Ray F. Ferrero Jr., former president and current chancellor of Nova Southeastern University
 Fred Gainous, former president of Florida A&M University
 S. Malcolm Gillis, former president of Rice University
 Madlyn L. Hanes, current president of Penn State Harrisburg
 Carl Hite, president of Cleveland State Community College, Tennessee
 Robert Lindgren, current president of Randolph-Macon College
 Charles N. Millican, founding president of the University of Central Florida
 Stephen C. O'Connell, former president of the University of Florida, former Florida Supreme Court justice
 Eduardo J. Padrón, current president of Miami Dade College
 Paul G. Pearson, former president of Miami University and former interim president for Rutgers University
 William L. Proctor, former chancellor of Flagler College
 Michael Rao, current president of Virginia Commonwealth University, and former president of Central Michigan University
 W. Reece Smith Jr., former president of the University of South Florida and the American Bar Association, and Rhodes Scholar
 Norman L. Stephens Jr., current president of South Florida State College
 Ann Stuart, current president of Texas Woman's University
 Janet Todd, current president of Lucy Cavendish College at the University of Cambridge
 E. Jean Walker, former president of Virginia Highlands Community College

Politicians, military officers, and judges

 Alto L. Adams, former justice of the Florida Supreme Court
 Philip Agee, former operative for the Central Intelligence Agency
 J.D. Alexander, former member of the Florida Senate
 John R. Alison, the father of U.S. Air Force special operations
 Chester R. Allen, major general in the Marine Corps and former Quartermaster General
 William C. Andrews, former member of the Florida House of Representatives
 Harry Lee Anstead, former justice of the Florida Supreme Court
 Winston Arnow, judge who presided over the Gainesville Eight trial
 Jeffrey Atwater, former Chief Financial Officer of Florida and former president of the Florida Senate
 Byllye Avery, health care activist
 Doug Band, chief advisor to former president Bill Clinton; created the Clinton Global Initiative and is also a founding partner of Teneo, a global consulting firm
 Dempsey Barron, former President of the Florida Senate
 Charles R. Black Jr., lobbyist; adviser to President Ronald Reagan
 Dick Black, current member of the Virginia Senate
 Ellyn Bogdanoff, current member of the Florida Senate
 John F. Bolt, lieutenant colonel, United States Marine Corps, Naval Aviator, Navy Cross recipient
 Pam Bondi, former Attorney General of Florida
 Rob Bradley, current member of the Florida Senate
 Bob Butterworth, former Florida Attorney General, dean of St. Thomas University College of Law
 Scott Camil, political activist, known primarily for leading the Gainesville Eight
 John F. Campbell, current President pro tempore of the Vermont State Senate
 Skip Campbell, former member of the Florida Senate, ran unsuccessfully for Florida Attorney General, professor at Nova Southeastern University
 Dean Cannon, former Speaker of the Florida House of Representatives
 Bernadette Castro, former Commissioner of Parks, Recreation, and Historic Preservation for the State of New York
 Agripino Cawich, former member of the Belize House of Representatives
 Leonard F. Chapman Jr., general, United States Marine Corps, 24th Commandant of the Marine Corps
 Mack Cleveland, former member of the Florida Senate
 Rik Combs, Retired USAF Officer and 2020 Missouri Gubernatorial Candidate.  
 Doyle Conner, former Florida Commissioner of Agriculture, and former Speaker of the Florida House of Representatives
 C. Welborn Daniel, former member of the Florida Senate
 Louis A. de la Parte Jr., former President of the Florida Senate
 Paula Dockery, former member of the Florida Senate and current Majority Whip
 Stan Dromisky, former member of the House of Commons of Canada, current professor and a director of the Thunder Bay Art Gallery
 Raymond Ehrlich, former justice of the Florida Supreme Court
 Richard Ervin, former Florida Attorney General
 Earl Faircloth, former Florida Attorney General
 Marc Feinstein, Minority Whip of the South Dakota House of Representatives
 Steven W. Fisher, former judge for the New York Supreme Court
 Anitere Flores, current member of the Florida Senate
 Nikki Fried, current commissioner of the Florida Department of Agriculture
 Jamal Sowell, current CEO and President of Enterprise Florida and the Florida Secretary of Commerce
 Dane Eagle, current Executive Director of the Florida Department of Economic Opportunity and former member of the Florida House of Representatives
 Lou Frost, public defender in Jacksonville for 36 years
 Piti Gándara, member of the House of Representatives of Puerto Rico
 Jason Gonzalez, former General Counsel to the Governor of Florida
 George Greer, circuit court judge who presided over the Terri Schiavo case, he serves in the Pinellas-Pasco County Circuit Court
 Stephen H. Grimes, former justice of the Florida Supreme Court
 Ralph Haben, former Speaker of the Florida House of Representatives and lobbyist
 Mattox Hair, former member of the Florida Senate
 Dorsey B. Hardeman, former member of both houses of the Texas State Legislature and former mayor of San Angelo
 Stuart A. Herrington, author and retired counterintelligence officer with the United States Army
 Bertram Herlong, former bishop with the Episcopal Diocese of Tennessee
 Mallory Horne, former president of the Florida Senate, former Speaker of the Florida House of Representatives
 Bruce Jacob, former assistant attorney general of Florida, and prosecuted in Gideon v. Wainwright
 Joe Jacquot, former deputy attorney general of the State of Florida
 Adam M. Jarchow, current member of the Wisconsin State Assembly
 Frederick B. Karl, former justice of the Florida Supreme Court and former member of the Florida Senate
 Mitchell Kaye, member of the Georgia House of Representatives
 Larry Kirkwood, former member of the Florida House of Representatives
 Joseph Kittinger, colonel, U.S. Air Force; USAF fighter pilot known for his high-altitude balloon flights and parachute jumps
 Jeff Kottkamp, former Florida lieutenant governor
 James W. Kynes, former Florida Attorney General, former vice president for the Jim Walter Corporation
 Jorge Labarga, current justice of the Florida Supreme Court
 Lewis Landes, former U.S. Army colonel and prominent attorney
 Row Lewis, Grenadian activist
 Evelyn J. Lynn, current member of the Florida Senate
 Scott Makar, former Florida Solicitor General
 Parker Lee McDonald, former justice of the Florida Supreme Court
 Virginia Montes, Latina civil rights activist and feminist
 Ashley Moody, current Florida Attorney General, Florida Thirteenth Judicial Circuit Court Judge 
Marcela Mulholland, political director of Data for Progress 
 Stephen C. O'Connell, former justice of the Florida Supreme Court and president of the University of Florida
 Ben F. Overton, former justice of the Florida Supreme Court
 Andrew Owens, former Gators basketball player and current circuit Court judge
 Obie Patterson, current member of the Maryland House of Delegates
 Robert C. Pittman, awarded the Distinguished Flying Cross
 Verle A. Pope, former President of the Florida Senate
 Edgar Price, former member of the Florida Senate
 Adam Putnam, former member of the U.S. House of Representatives, former Florida Commissioner of Agriculture
 Nan Rich, current member of the Florida Senate
 Jose Rodriguez, 31-year veteran of the Central Intelligence Agency, where he served as the Director of the National Clandestine Service
 Richard Sealy, Barbadian Tourism Minister
 Harold Sebring, judge at the Nuremberg Trials, former justice of the Florida Supreme Court
 T. Terrell Sessums, former speaker of the House of Representatives for Florida, former chairman of the Florida Board of Regents
 William A. Shands, former member of the Florida Senate and namesake of the Shands Hospital
 Robert Shevin, former Florida Attorney General, current judge on Third District Court of Appeal of Florida
 Bruce Smathers, former Florida Secretary of State
 Terry Smiljanich, counsel to the U.S. Senate during the Congressional hearing on the Iran-Contra Affair
 Rod Smith, former member of the Florida Senate, successfully prosecuted Danny Rolling, ran unsuccessfully for Governor of Florida
 Keith Sonderling, Commissioner of the U.S. Equal Employment Opportunity Commission 
Susan Stanton, former city manager of Largo, Florida, and transsexual activist
 Douglas Stenstrom, former member of the Florida Senate
 Mac Stipanovich, Republican lobbyist and political consultant who had a large role in the 2000 Florida Recount
 Evelyn L. Stratton, current justice of the Ohio Supreme Court
 William Glenn Terrell, former justice of the Florida Supreme Court
 Tommy Thompson, current member of the Kentucky House of Representatives
 B. Campbell Thornal, former justice of the Florida Supreme Court
 Ralph Turlington, former Speaker of the Florida House of Representatives
 W. Fred Turner, successful attorney in the landmark U.S. Supreme Court case Gideon v. Wainwright
 Tom Warner, former Florida Solicitor General and former member of the Florida House of Representatives
 Marc Warren, currently an administrator for the Federal Aviation Administration
 Charles T. Wells, former justice of the Florida Supreme Court
 Lezlee Westine, former Assistant to the President for Public Liaison in the Bush Administration
 Jim Williams, former deputy secretary of the U.S. Department of Agriculture, and former Florida lieutenant governor
 Charles F. Willis, distinguished Naval Aviator who served as an aide to U.S. President Dwight D. Eisenhower

United States Ambassadors
 Frank Almaguer, former U.S. Ambassador to Honduras
 Lucius D. Battle, former U.S. Ambassador to Egypt, former president of the Middle Eastern Institute
 Carey Cavanaugh, former U.S. Ambassador, current director of Patterson School of Diplomacy
 Stanley Tuemler Escudero, former U.S. Ambassador to Tajikistan, Uzbekistan and Azerbaijan
 Dennis K. Hays, former U.S. Ambassador to Suriname
 Barbara J. Stephenson, former U.S. Ambassador to Panama and current United States Minister to the United Kingdom
 Donald L. Tucker, former U.S. Ambassador to the Dominican Republic, former Speaker of the Florida House of Representatives
 A. Vernon Weaver, former U.S. Ambassador to the European Union

United States Senators

 Charles O. Andrews, former U.S. Senator
 Lawton Chiles, former U.S. Senator and Florida governor
 John Porter East, former U.S. Senator (North Carolina)
 Bob Graham, former U.S. Senator, Florida governor, and U.S. Presidential Candidate
 William Luther Hill, former U.S. Senator
 Spessard Holland, former U.S. Senator and Florida governor, founder of Holland & Knight
 Connie Mack III, former U.S. Senator and U.S. Representative
 Bill Nelson, former U.S. Senator and U.S. Representative
 Marco Rubio, current U.S. Senator, and former Speaker of the Florida House of Representatives
 George A. Smathers, former U.S. Senator, U.S. Representative, and benefactor of the George A. Smathers Libraries at the University of Florida

Federal Judges

 Sidney Aronovitz, former judge for the U.S. District Court (Southern District of Florida)
 C. Clyde Atkins, former judge for the U.S. District Court (Southern District of Florida)
 William J. Barker, former judge for the U.S. District Court (Southern District of Florida)
 Rosemary Barkett, current judge for the U.S. Court of Appeals (Eleventh Circuit), former justice of the Florida Supreme Court
 Susan H. Black, current judge for the U.S. Court of Appeals (Eleventh Circuit), former judge for the U.S. District Court (Middle District of Florida)
 Beth Bloom, current judge for the U.S. District Court (Southern District of Florida)
 William J. Castagna, current senior judge for the U.S. District Court (Middle District of Florida)
 Anne C. Conway, current chief judge for the U.S. District Court (Middle District of Florida)
 Roy B. Dalton Jr., current judge for the U.S. District Court (Middle District of Florida)
 Brian J. Davis, current judge for the U.S. District Court (Middle District of Florida)
 Edward B. Davis, former judge for the U.S. District Court (Southern District of Florida)
 William Dimitrouleas, current judge for the U.S. District Court (Southern District of Florida)

 Joe Oscar Eaton, former judge for the U.S. District Court (Southern District of Florida)
 Patricia C. Fawsett, current senior judge for the U.S. District Court (Middle District of Florida)
 Peter T. Fay, current senior judge for the U.S. Court of Appeals (Eleventh Circuit), former judge for the U.S. District Court (Southern District of Florida)
 Charles B. Fulton, former chief judge of the U.S. District Court (Southern District of Florida), 1966–1977
 Alan Stephen Gold, current judge for the U.S. District Court (Southern District of Florida)
 William Terrell Hodges, current senior judge for the U.S. District Court (Middle District of Florida)
 Charlene Honeywell, current judge for the U.S. District Court (Middle District of Florida)
 Marcia Morales Howard, current judge for the U.S. District Court (Southern District of Florida)
 Paul Huck, current senior judge for the U.S. District Court (Southern District of Florida)
 Elizabeth Jenkins, current U.S. Magistrate Judge (Middle District of Florida)
 James W. Kehoe, former judge for the U.S. Court of Appeals (Eleventh Circuit), and U.S. District Court (Southern District of Florida)
 James Lawrence King, current senior judge for the U.S. District Court (Southern District of Florida)
 Ben Krentzman, former judge for the U.S. District Court (Southern District of Florida)
 Richard A. Lazzara, current judge for the U.S. District Court (Middle District of Florida)
 William McRae, former judge for the U.S. District Court (Southern District of Florida; Middle District of Florida)
 William O. Mehrtens, former judge for the U.S. District Court (Southern District of Florida)
 Howell W. Melton, current judge for the U.S. District Court (Middle District of Florida)
 Steven D. Merryday, current judge for the U.S. District Court (Middle District of Florida)
 Stephan P. Mickle, current judge for the U.S. District Court (Northern District of Florida)
 David L. Middlebrooks, former judge for the U.S. District Court (Northern District of Florida)
 Donald M. Middlebrooks, current judge for the U.S. District Court (Southern District of Florida)
 James S. Moody Jr., current judge for the U.S. District Court (Middle District of Florida)
 Ralph Wilson Nimmons Jr., former judge for the U.S. District Court (Middle District of Florida)
 James Carriger Paine, current senior judge for the U.S. District Court (Southern District of Florida)
 Maurice M. Paul, current senior judge for the U.S. District Court (Northern District of Florida)
 S. Jay Plager, current judge for the U.S. Court of Appeals (Federal Circuit)
 Gregory A. Presnell, current judge for the U.S. District Court (Middle District of Florida)
 John M. Bryan Simpson, former judge for the U.S. Court of Appeals (Fifth Circuit), and U.S. District Court (Southern District of Florida)
 John Richard Smoak Jr., current judge for the U.S. District Court (Northern District of Florida)
 Eugene P. Spellman, former judge for the U.S. District Court (Southern District of Florida)
 Jose Victor Toledo, former judge for (United States District Court for the District of Puerto Rico)
 Ursula Mancusi Ungaro, current judge for the U.S. District Court (Southern District of Florida)
 Mark E. Walker, current judge for the U.S. District Court (Northern District of Florida)
 George Whitehurst, former judge for the U.S. District Court (Northern and Southern Districts of Florida)
 James Whittemore, current judge for the U.S. District Court (Middle District of Florida)
 George C. Young, former judge for the U.S. District Court (Northern, Middle and Southern Districts of Florida)
 Kathryn Kimball Mizelle, current judge for the U.S. District Court (Middle District of Florida)

United States Representatives

 Jason Altmire, former U.S. Representative
 Charles Edward Bennett, former U.S. Representative
 Gus Bilirakis, current U.S. Representative
 Michael Bilirakis, former U.S. Representative
 Corrine Brown, former U.S. Representative
 William V. Chappell Jr., former U.S. Representative
 Ander Crenshaw, former U.S. Representative
 Jim Davis, former U.S. Representative, ran unsuccessfully for Governor of Florida
 Don Fuqua, former U.S. Representative
 Sam Gibbons, former U.S. Representative
 James W. Grant, former U.S. Representative
 Robert A. Green, former U.S. Representative
 Bill Gunter, former U.S. Representative
 Syd Herlong, former U.S. Representative
 Marjorie Holt, former U.S. Representative
 Craig James, former U.S. Representative
 Evan Jenkins, former U.S. Representative from West Virginia
 Harry Johnston, former U.S. Representative
 Bill Lantaff, former U.S. Representative
 Tom Lewis, former U.S. Representative
 Connie Mack III, former U.S. Representative and U.S. Senator
 Connie Mack IV, former U.S. Representative
 Buddy MacKay, former U.S. Representative
 Betsy Markey, former U.S. Representative
 Donald Ray Matthews, former U.S. Representative
 Bill McCollum, former U.S. Representative and former Florida Attorney General
 Chester B. McMullen, former U.S. Representative
 Daniel Mica, former U.S. Representative
 John Mica, former U.S. Representative
 Dan Miller, former U.S. Representative
 Jeff Miller, former U.S. Representative
 Bill Nelson, former U.S. Representative and current U.S. Senator
 J. Hardin Peterson, former U.S. Representative
 Adam Putnam, former U.S. Representative
 Paul G. Rogers, former U.S. Representative
 Tom Rooney, former U.S. Representative
 Dennis A. Ross, current U.S. Representative
 Joe Scarborough, former U.S. Representative and current MSNBC talk show host
 Debbie Wasserman Schultz, current U.S. Representative
 Bob Sikes, former U.S. Representative
 Karen Thurman, former U.S. Representative
 Robert Wexler, former U.S. Representative
 Ted Yoho, current U.S. Representative

Governors

 Reubin O'Donovan Askew, former Florida governor
 C. Farris Bryant, former Florida governor
 Lawton Chiles, former Florida governor and U.S. Senator
 Bob Graham, former Florida governor, U.S. Senator, and Presidential Candidate
 Spessard Holland, former Florida governor U.S. Senator, and founder of Holland & Knight
 Charley Eugene Johns, former governor
 Buddy MacKay, former Florida governor and Florida lieutenant governor
 Daniel T. McCarty, former Florida governor
 Wayne Mixson, former Florida governor and lieutenant governor
 Beverly Perdue, former North Carolina governor, and former North Carolina lieutenant governor
 Fuller Warren, former Florida governor
 Ron DeSantis, 46th Governor of Florida, Since 2019

Mayors

 Ed Austin, former mayor of Jacksonville, Florida
 Lenny Curry, current mayor of Jacksonville, Florida
 John Delaney, former mayor of Jacksonville, Florida
 Buddy Dyer, current mayor of Orlando, Florida
 Randy Ewers, current mayor of Ocala, Florida
 Robert L. Floyd, former mayor of Miami, Florida
 Pegeen Hanrahan, former mayor of Gainesville
 Rick Kriseman, mayor of St. Petersburg, Florida
 John Land, currently the longest-serving mayor in the history of the State of Florida
 Julian Lane, former mayor of Tampa, Florida
 Craig Lowe, former mayor of Gainesville, Florida
 William F. Poe, former mayor of Tampa, Florida
 Hans Tanzler, former mayor of Jacksonville, Florida

Generals and admirals

 John R. Alison, retired U.S. Air Force major general, and father of Air Force Special Operations
 George F. Baughman, retired U.S. Navy rear admiral, and founding president of New College of Florida
 Albert H. Blanding, retired U.S. Army lieutenant general
 Richard E. Cellon, active U.S. Navy rear admiral
 Leonard F. Chapman Jr., retired U.S. Marine Corps general, former Commandant of the Marine Corps
 Charles W. Dorman, retired U.S. Marine Corps brigadier general, former Chief Judge of the U.S. Navy-Marine Corps Court of Criminal Appeals
 Mark T. Emerson, active U.S. Navy rear admiral, current commander of the Naval Strike and Air Warfare Center
 Joseph C. Joyce, retired U.S. Army brigadier general, current vice president of Institute of Food and Agricultural Sciences
 Richard B. Landolt, active U.S. Navy rear admiral
 John M. LeMoyne, retired U.S. Army Lieutenant general
 Leon E. Salomon, retired U.S. Army general, current vice president for Rubbermaid
 Leland C. Shepard, retired U.S. Air Force brigadier general
 Alan S. Thompson, retired U.S. Navy Vice Admiral; former Director of U.S. Defense Logistics Agency 
 Paul Tibbets, retired U.S. Air Force brigadier general, pilot of the Enola Gay
 Kenneth S. Wilsbach, active U.S. Air Force general

Business executives, policy leaders, and others

 Khalid bin Mohammed Al Angari, former Minister of Higher Education for the Kingdom of Saudi Arabia
 Raymond W. Alden III, current provost and executive vice president of Northern Illinois University
 A. Paul Anderson, former commissioner of the United States Federal Maritime Commission
 Steve Atkiss, former Chief of Staff at the U.S. Customs and Border Protection and principal with Command Consulting Group
 DuBose Ausley, former chairman of the Florida Board of Regents
 Debra D. Austin, former chancellor of the State University System of Florida
 Thomas E. Baker, founding member of the Florida International University College of Law
 Holly Benson, former secretary of the Florida Department of Business and Professional Regulation
 Alan Stephenson Boyd, former secretary of the United States Department of Transportation
 Robert B. Bradley, current vice president at Florida State University
 David Bryan, bishop in the Anglican Church in North America
 Carol Browner, former director of the White House Office of Energy and Climate Change Policy in the Obama administration and former Administrator of the Environmental Protection Agency
 Dana Bullen, former director of the Press Freedom Committee, former foreign editor of The Washington Star
 Kiki Carter, former environmental activist, organizer, songwriter, and columnist
 Robert B. Carter, current CIO of the FedEx Corporation
 Alan Cohen, former owner of the Florida Panthers hockey team
 John J. Considine, current senior minister for the Unity Church, former member of the Florida House of Representatives
 Marshall Criser, former chairman of Scripps Florida, and former president of the University of Florida
 Marshall Criser III, current chancellor of the State University System of Florida
 J. Broward Culpepper, first chancellor of the State University System of Florida, and former dean at Florida State University
 J.J. Daniel, former publisher of The Florida Times-Union and Jacksonville Journal
 Paul Rand Dixon, former commissioner and chairman of the Federal Trade Commission
 Ngo Dong, founder of Cuong Nhu
 Carl Epting, current bishop for the Episcopal Church
 Mark Erstling, senior vice president and chief operating officer for the Association of Public Television Stations
 Mark S. Fowler, former Federal Communications Commissioner
 Richard Gershon, current dean of the University of Mississippi School of Law
 Pedro José Greer, winner of the Presidential Medal of Freedom, and assistant dean for Florida International University College of Medicine
 Bill Gurley, general partner at Benchmark Capital
 Nikolas Gvosdev, former editor of The National Interest and professor at the Naval War College and Georgetown University
 John Halinski, former Deputy Administrator for the Transportation Security Administration
 Mason Hawkins, founder of Southeastern Asset Management
 Kenneth T. Henson, current dean of education at The Citadel
 Bertram Nelson Herlong, former Episcopal bishop of Tennessee
 Thomas Hill, former vice president at Iowa State University
 Lawrence J. Hoffman, founder of Greenberg Traurig
 Willis N. Holcombe, former chancellor of the Florida College System
 Van Ellis Huff, inventor of the jalousie window
 Steven J. Kachelmeier, current editor of The Accounting Review and professor at The University of Texas at Austin
 Mark E. Kaplan, former Secretary of the Florida Department of Transportation
 Jack Katz, founder and chief executive officer of the Panama Jack Company
 Denise Krepp, former Chief Council for U.S. Maritime Administration
 Douglas Leigh, advertising executive, and pioneer in signage and outdoor advertising, and created New York City's Times Square
 Josh Linkner, founder, chief executive officer and executive chairman of ePrize, chief executive officer and general partner of Detroit Venture Partners
 Chris Linn, current vice president for MTV
 Robert Love, software developer who uses open source, known for his contributions to the Linux kernel
 Alan M. Lovelace, former deputy administrator of NASA
 Jonathan Lovitz, national LGBT advocate, Senior Vice President with National LGBT Chamber of Commerce, and political organizer
 CJ Lyons, physician and writer of medical suspense novels
 Stephen MacNamara, current vice president of Florida State University
 Scott Makar, former Florida Solicitor General
 Jack C. Massey, former owner of Kentucky Fried Chicken and founder of Hospital Corporation of America
 Bill McBride, lawyer, former managing partner of Holland & Knight, ran unsuccessfully for Governor of Florida in 2002
 Kip McKean, founder of the International Churches of Christ
 James E. McLean, current dean of education at the University of Alabama
 Howell W. Melton Jr., former managing partner for Holland & Knight
 Jon L. Mills, former dean of the university's Fredric G. Levin College of Law
 Dianna Fuller Morgan, former senior vice president of Walt Disney World, current chairman of the University of Florida Board of Trustees
 John Morgan, founder of Morgan & Morgan nationwide personal injury firm
 Joe Nosef, current chairman of the Mississippi Republican Party
 Esther Olavarria, current deputy assistant secretary for United States Department of Homeland Security
 Karen W. Pane, former assistant secretary for the United States Department of Veterans Affairs
 Wilford B. Poe, current vice president for the Space Systems Group
 William F. Powers, former vice president of research for the Ford Motor Company
 Buzz Ritchie, co-founder of Gulf Coast Community Bank, former member of Florida House of Representatives
 Jose A. Rodriguez Jr., former director of the Central Intelligence Agency's National Clandestine Service
 Howie Roseman, current general manager of the Philadelphia Eagles
 Stephen M. Ross, current owner of the Miami Dolphins
 Scott W. Rothstein, disbarred attorney and convicted felon charged with perpetrating a $1.2 billion Ponzi scheme
 Frederick H. Schultz, former vice chairman of the Federal Reserve System, and former Speaker of the Florida House of Representatives
 Frank Shorter, former chairman of the United States Anti-Doping Agency, and Olympic gold medalist
 James F. Sirmons, radio broadcast pioneer and former executive vice president of Industrial Relations at CBS
 Eric J. Smith, former Education Commissioner of Florida
 Hal Steinbrenner, current executive vice president and general partner for the New York Yankees
 Haywood Sullivan, former owner of the Boston Red Sox
 Melinda Lou Thomas, namesake of Wendy's restaurants and daughter of Wendy's founder Dave Thomas
 James R. Thompson Jr., former director of NASA's Marshall Space Flight Center
 Karen Thurman, former chairwoman of the Florida Democratic Party, and former U.S. Representative
 Julie K. Underwood, current dean of the University of Wisconsin-Madison School of Education
 Craig Waters, spokesman for the Florida Supreme Court during the 2000 presidential election controversy
 James L. Wattenbarger, creator of the Florida Community Colleges System
 A. Vernon Weaver, former administrator of the U.S. Small Business Administration
 Harry Wismer, founding owner of the New York Titans, which became the New York Jets

Presidents and chief executive officers

 Braulio Alonso, former president of the National Education Association (NEA)
 Martha Barnett, former president of American Bar Association (ABA)
 Edward L. Bowen, current president of Grayson-Jockey Club Research Foundation
 Alan Stephenson Boyd, former president of Amtrak, Airbus, and Illinois Central Railroad
 James W. Bradford (BA 1969), CEO of AFG Industries, 1992–1999, and the United Glass Corporation 1999–2001
 Malcolm Bricklin, former CEO of Subaru of America and creator of the Bricklin SV-1
 Joie Chitwood, current president and chief operating officer of the Indianapolis Motor Speedway
 Robert Cohn, former CEO and founder of Octel Communications
 Gay Culverhouse, former president of the Tampa Bay Buccaneers
 Sandy D'Alemberte, former president the American Bar Association, and Florida State University
 John Dasburg, former CEO of Northwest Airlines, and former chairman of the Burger King Corporation
 Martin Ebner (born 1945), Swiss billionaire businessman
 Michele Elliott, author, psychologist, and founder of child protection charity Kidscape
 Manuel Fernandez, former CEO of Gartner, and former chairman of the University of Florida Board of Trustees
 Craig Fleisher, former president of the international association of Strategic and Competitive Intelligence Professionals, Chair of the Competitive Intelligence Foundation 
 Mary Lou Foy, former president of the National Press Photographers Association
 Bill France Jr., former president of NASCAR
 André-Philippe Futa, former president of Parti de l'Alliance Nationale pour l'Unité
 Todd H. Goldman, founder and CEO of the David and Goliath Company
 Mércio Pereira Gomes, former president of the National Foundation for Indigenous Peoples (FUNAI)
 Alexander Grass, founder and former CEO of Rite Aid
 Ben Hill Griffin III, former chairman and CEO of Alico, Inc.
 Kelsie B. Harder, former president of the American Name Society and professor
 Linda Hudson, former president of BAE Systems' Land & Armaments
 Susan Ivey, current chairman and CEO of Reynolds American
 John Janick, founder and current CEO of Fueled by Ramen Records
 William King, former president of the National Academy of Design
 Anjan Lahiri, current CEO of Birlasoft
 Alan Levine, current CEO of the Broward Hospital District, former Secretary of Florida Agency for Healthcare Administration
 Betsy Markey, current CEO of Syscom Services, former U.S. Representative
 Steven Marrs, founder and current CEO of Branded Pictures
 J. Keith Moyer, former publisher of the Minneapolis Star Tribune
 Sara Myers, former president of the American Theological Library Association
 David Nelms, current CEO of Discover Financial
 Nandini Nimbkar, President of Nimbkar Agricultural Research Institute
 Kike Oniwinde, founder of BYP Network
 Fikret Orman, current president of Beşiktaş J.K., a Turkish sports club
 Donna Pastore, current president of the National Association for Girls & Women in sports
 Herb Peyton, founder and president of the Gate Petroleum Company
 Satya Prabhakar, founder and current CEO of Sulekha
 Gary B. Pruitt, current president and CEO of the Associated Press
 Edward G. Roberts Jr., former president of the Federation of Professional Athletes, inducted to the International Motorsports Hall of Fame
 Howard Roffman, current president of Lucas Licensing
 Al Rosen, former president of the Houston Astros and New York Yankees
 Sachio Semmoto, current CEO for eAccess and eMobile
 Eleanor Smeal, former president of National Organization for Women (NOW)
 Chesterfield Smith, former president of the American Bar Association (ABA)
 W. Reece Smith Jr., former president of the American Bar Association, and the University of South Florida; Rhodes Scholar
 Sung Won Sohn, current CEO of Hanmi Financial Corp, former chief economist of Wells Fargo
 Margaretta Styles, former president of the American Nurses Association
 David M. Thomas, former CEO of IMS Health
 Carlos O. Torano, current president of Toraño Cigars and Central America Tobacco
 Nusli Wadia, Chairman of the Wadia Group, son of Neville Wadia and Dina Wadia, grandson of Muhammad Ali Jinnah and Rattanbai Jinnah
 Wayne Weaver, former owner of the Jacksonville Jaguars, current CEO of Shoe Carnival
 Scott Weiss, former CEO of IronPort Systems, Inc.
 Lezlee Westine, current president and CEO of Personal Care Products Council
 Robert Wexler, current president of the Center for Middle East Peace & Economic Cooperation, former U.S. Representative
 Charles F. Willis, former president of Alaska Airlines
 Walter J. Zable, founder, and former chairman and CEO of Cubic Corporation
 Stephen N. Zack, former president of the American Bar Association (ABA)
 Anita Zucker, former governor and chairman of the Hudson's Bay Company
 Jerry Zucker, former CEO of the Polymer Group and former governor and chairman of the Hudson's Bay Company

Architects

 Alberto Alfonso, founding principal and President of Alfonso Architects
 Carlos J. Alfonso, founding principal and CEO of Alfonso Architects, former chairman of the University of Florida Board of Trustees
 Alex Anmahian, co-founding partner of Anmahian Winton Architects and faculty member at Harvard University
 Stephen Francis Jones, architect known for high-end restaurant designs
 Beatriz del Cueto Lopez, Cuban-born architect
 Gene Leedy, leading practitioner of the Sarasota School of Architecture
 Alfred Browning Parker, Modernist architect
 William Rupp, architect
 Lawrence Scarpa, current CEO of Brooks + Scarpa

Athletic directors

 Bill Carr, former athletic director for the University of Houston and the University of Florida
 Paul Dee, former athletic director for the University of Miami
 Doug Dickey, former athletic director for the University of Tennessee
 Bill Proctor, former athletic director for Florida State University
 Keith R. Tribble, former athletic director for the University of Central Florida

University benefactors

 Ben Hill Griffin Jr., Florida citrus farmer, major University of Florida benefactor, namesake of the university's Ben Hill Griffin Stadium
 William R. Hough, prominent investment banker, major university benefactor, namesake of the university's Hough Graduate School of Business
 Fred Levin, prominent attorney, major university benefactor, namesake of the university's Levin College of Law,
 Alfred A. McKethan, former chairman of SunTrust Bank, major university benefactor, namesake of the university's Alfred A. McKethan Field
 George Smathers, former U.S. Senator, major university benefactor, namesake of university's The George A. Smathers Libraries
 Al Warrington, former CEO of Sanfill, university benefactor, former chairman of UF's Board of Trustees, namesake of UF's Warrington College of Business
 Herbert Wertheim, inventor, scientist, educator, clinician, entrepreneur, philanthropist and community leader

Arts, literature, humanities, and entertainment

 Shane Acker, filmmaker, 9
 Don Addis, long-time newspaper columnist and syndicated comic strip artist for the St. Petersburg Times
 Chris Adrian, novelist and short-story writer, Gob's Grief
 Lauren Anderson, model
 Adaeze Atuegwu, writer
 Chris Bachelder, novelist, short-story writer, and e-book pioneer
 Todd Barry, stand-up comedian, actor and voice actor
 Joseph Beckham, writer on the topic of legal problems in education, winner of the McGhehey award, and currently a professor of education leadership at Florida State University
 Wayne Besen, former spokesman for the Human Rights Campaign, and gay rights advocate
 Mike Bianchi, sports columnist for the Orlando Sentinel
 Dan Bilzerian, professional poker player, actor, and internet social media personality
 Matt Borondy, publisher for Identity Theory online magazine
 Edward L. Bowen, horse racing historian
 Wendy Brenner, author and professor; Phone Calls From the Dead, Large Animals in Everyday Life: Stories
 Rita Mae Brown, author and activist
 Alan Burnett, television producer and writer
 Mike Burns, music producer
 Al Burt, Miami Herald and Atlanta Journal writer
 Kevin Canty, author; Into the Great Wide Open, Nine Below Zero, and Winslow in Love
 Kelly Carrington, model
 Alfred A. Cave, professor, historian, and author
 Debbie Cenziper, journalist with The Washington Post, and winner of the Pulitzer Prize
 Jean Chance, chairman of the Hearst Awards Committee for 25 years, professor of journalism at the University of Florida
 Peter Christopher, author, Campfires of the Dead
 Michael Connelly, best-selling author
 Paul Cootner, economist, author of The Random Character of Stock Market Prices
 Harry Crews, novelist, short story writer, and essayist
 Mark Curtis, journalist, author, and political analyst
 Jeff Darlington, current sportswriter for the Miami Herald
 Jonathan Demme, motion picture director, won Academy Award for directing for The Silence of the Lambs
 Karen DeYoung, Pulitzer Prize recipient, The Washington Post associate editor
 Kate DiCamillo, award-winning children's novelist and screenwriter
 Micki Dickoff, television director and producer, winner of multiple Emmy Awards
 Brian Doherty, senior editor of Reason magazine, author
 Gregg Doyel, sports writer for CBSSports.com
 Brian Drolet, actor, producer and writer
 Louann Fernald, model and actress
 Robert W. Fichter, photographer
 Rich Fields, announcer of The Price Is Right, meteorologist, radio personality, voice actor
 Lolita Files, author, screenwriter, and producer
 Dexter Filkins, Pulitzer Prize-winning journalist
 Jesse Hill Ford, writer and screenwriter
 Michael France, screenwriter for GoldenEye, The Hulk, and Punisher
 Robert Fulton, award-winning writer and naturalist
 Alan Gallay, American historian, and winner of the National Endowment for the Humanities Fellowship
 Michael Gannon, military historian and Catholic priest
 Leslie Yalof Garfield, current editor of the Journal of Court Innovation and professor at Pace Law School
 Merrill Gerber, author
 Norman Gilliland, author, WERN host
 GloZell, comedian
 MaryAnne Golon, picture editor for Time magazine
 Philip Graham, former publisher of The Washington Post
 Edwin Granberry, long-time writer of the comic strip Buz Sawyer
 Richard Grayson, writer and political activist
 Rebecca Greer, Woman's Day editor
 James Grippando, novelist and lawyer
 Israel Gutierrez, Miami Herald columnist, former Palm Beach Post columnist
 Nikolas Gvosdev, international relations scholar
 Robert J. Haiman, St. Petersburg Times executive editor, Poynter Institute president
 Rebecca Heflin (pseudonym of Dianne Farb), romance novelist and attorney
Carol Hernandez, journalist, educator, Pulitzer Prize winner
 Edward D. Hess, author and professor
 Carl Hiaasen, novelist, Miami Herald columnist, won the Newbery Honor
 Rob Hiaasen, The Capital columnist and editor, adjunct journalism professor at the University of Maryland's Philip Merrill College of Journalism, victim of Capital Gazette shooting 
 Shere Hite, author of The Hite Report, sex educator, and feminist
 Noy Holland, author of What Begins With Bird and Spectacle of the Body
 Elise Ippolito, artist
 Judith Ivory, best-selling author of historical romance novels
 Jarrod Jablonski, pioneering technical diver and record setting cave diver
 Eberhard Jäckel, German historian
 Jamali, Indian-American painter and sculptor 
 Clint Johnson, American historian and author
 Madison Jones, novelist and former professor at Auburn University
 Steven J. Kachelmeier, current editor of The Accounting Review, and professor at the University of Texas
 Artie Kempner, director for FOX Sports
 Stetson Kennedy, award-winning author and human rights activist
 Eliot Kleinberg, author and writer for the Palm Beach Post
 Jeff Klinkenberg, author and reporter for the Tampa Bay Times
 Victoria Lancelotta, current editor of the Georgetown Review, author
 Mernet Larsen, artist
 Charlotte Laws, author, talk show host, and community activist
 Gary Russell Libby, art historian, curator, and museum director
 Will Ludwigsen, writer of horror, mystery, and science fiction
 C. J. Lyons, physician and writer of medical suspense novels
 Moss Mabry, costume designer, nominated for four Academy Awards
 Ron Magill, photographer and wildlife expert
 Thomas E. Mann, author and political pundit for the Brookings Institution
 Gabriel Martinez, Cuban-American artist
 Frances Mayes, author of best-selling book Under the Tuscan Sun
 Andrew McClurg, legal humor writer for the American Bar Association Journal
 Diane McFarlin, publisher of the Sarasota Herald Tribune
 Jon McKenzie, performance and media scholar and practitioner, professor at the University of Wisconsin–Madison
 Tom Meek, columnist and author of Another Day In Cyberville, Reflections On Media, and The Video Audio Overdose Galore
 Myka Meier, etiquette writer
 Louis A. Meyer, writer and painter
 Sam Michel, author of Under the Light; lecturer at University of Massachusetts Amherst
 Jessel Miller, watercolor artist and children's writer
 Andrew Mondshein, nominated for an Oscar for his film editing
James Morgan, scenic designer and Producing Artistic Director of the York Theatre
 Robert Morris, novelist
 Rodney Mullen, entertainer, skateboarder
 Lorraine Murray, author of Why Me, Why Now?, and Grace Notes
Jeff Nesmith, journalist, educator, Pulitzer Prize winner
 Lee Ann Newsom, anthropologist, named a MacArthur Fellow for 2002
 Ivan Osorio, columnist and editor at the Competitive Enterprise Institute
 Janis Owens, author
 Harvey Eugene Oyer III, author and attorney
 Mike Papantonio, trial lawyer, co-host of Ring of Fire
 Jeff Parker, novelist and short story writer
 John L. Parker Jr., writer
 David Penzer, current professional wrestling ring announcer for the WWE
 Kay Picart, author, artist, radio host, and producer
 Sam Proctor, one of the world's foremost scholars of Florida history
 Andrew Prokos, award-winning architectural and fine-art photographer
 Imad Rahman, author, I Dream of Microwaves
 Jeff Randall, former business editor of BBC News
 Marc Randazza, current editor of The Legal Satyricon
 Charlie Reed, current journalist with Stars and Stripes
 Pietra Rivoli, author and professor of finance at Georgetown University
 James Rizzi, pop artist
 Edward G. Roberts Jr., pioneer race car driver of NASCAR
 Alan G. Rogers, gay rights activist, and U.S. Army major who died in Operation Iraqi Freedom
 Thane Rosenbaum, novelist, essayist, and professor of law at Fordham University
 Rektok Ross, fiction writer, journalist, and entertainment host, best known for her contemporary romance novel Prodigal
 Scott Sanders, Emmy Award and Tony Award-winning television producer
 Mia Schaikewitz, TV personality and spokesperson for disability advocacy
 Julia Sell, former national coach for the United States Tennis Association
 Jeffrey Scott Shapiro, investigative journalist and attorney 
 Paul Shyre, director and playwright who won a Tony Award and an Emmy Award
 Eugene Sledge, WW2 United States Marine, biologist and university professor; author of With the Old Breed: At Peleliu and Okinawa
 Rick Smith, author, entrepreneur, and public speaker
 George Solomon, former sports editor and columnist for The Washington Post; first ombudsman for ESPN
 Julian Sprung, writer
 Howard Stelzer, composer and performer of electronic music
 Randall J. Stephens, author, editor, and historian of American religion
 Craig Symonds, distinguished American Civil War historian and former professor at the United States Naval Academy
 Maggie Taylor, digital imaging artist
 Janet Todd, Welsh-born author on books about women's literature; professor at the University of Aberdeen
 Kendra Todd, real estate businesswoman and winner of The Apprentice 3 reality TV show
 Victor Andres Triay, Cuban-American historian and writer
 Natasha Tsakos, performing artist and conceptual director 
 Claudio Véliz, Chilean author, historian, and Sociologist
 Robert Venditti, comic book writer
 Tarita Virtue, Trinidadian-American private detective, investigator, and model
 Sterling Watson, writer, Weep No More My Brother, The Calling, and Blind Tongues
 Bill Whittle, blogger, political commentator, director, screenwriter, editor, pilot, and author
 Edward Walton Wilcox, painter and sculptor
 Andrew Wilkow, conservative political talk radio host on Sirius Satellite Radio
 Hugh Wilson, director, writer, and actor
 Kevin Wilson, writer
 Edward Yang, Taiwanese filmmaker, winner of Best Director Award at Cannes for his 2000 film Yi Yi
 Hugo Zacchini, entertainer known as the "Human Cannonball"

Actors and actresses

 Casey Calvert, actress
 Kavita Channe, television and radio personality
 Jonathan Chase, actor, One on One, Another Gay Movie, Gingerdead Man, and 7eventy 5ive
 Richard E. Council, stage, television and film actor
 Abigail Cowen, actress
 Cathy Jenéen Doe, actress, Passions, Ed, and Buds for Life
 Kahil Dotay, actor, director, writer; won an award for his performance in Frank & Flo
 Faye Dunaway, actress, won an Academy Award for the movie Network
 Brian F. Durkin, actor, Broken Bridges, The O.C., and Deja Vu
 Buddy Ebsen, actor, best known as Jed Clampett on The Beverly Hillbillies
 Malcolm Gets, actor, Caroline in the City
 Darrell Hammond, actor and comedian, Saturday Night Live, Scary Movie 3, Epic Movie, and Agent Cody Banks
 Gavin Houston, actor, The Cosby Show
 Jes Macallan, actress, Mistresses
 Cameron David Magruder, actor and comedian
 Patty Maloney, actress, Far Out Space Nuts
 Patrick O'Neal, television and film actor
 Adrian Pasdar, actor on Heroes, Profit, and Near Dark
 Rain Phoenix, actress and musician
 Lenny Platt, actor best known for his portrayal of Nate Salinger on the US daytime soap opera One Life to Live
 Stephen Root, Emmy-nominated actor, best known as "Milton" in Office Space and for his performance in Dodgeball
 George Salazar, actor, Be More Chill
 Wil Shriner, actor, director and game show host
 Rachel Specter, actress in Prom Night, The House Bunny, and Alone in the Dark II
 Nancy Stafford, actress on Sidekicks, Matlock, and Judging Amy, and former Miss Florida
 Toby Turner, internet personality, actor, comedian and musician
 Dale Van Sickel, former president of the Stuntmen's Association of Motion Pictures
 Bob Vila, actor, home-improvement guru and former host of This Old House
 Tarita Virtue, Trinidadian actress and model on The Unit and Living the Dream
 Alisha Wainwright, actress
 Jordan Wall, television and film actor
 Robin Weisman, actress on Three Men and a Little Lady, and Thunder in Paradise
 Jack Youngblood, Emmy-nominated actor, author, and NFL/College Football Hall of Famer
 Vincent Martella, actor, Phineas and Ferb and Everybody Hates Chris

Head football coaches

 Kerwin Bell, former head coach for the Valdosta State Blazers and Jacksonville Dolphins, current offensive coordinator for the USF Bulls
 Gene Chizik, former head coach for the Auburn Tigers, former head coach of the Iowa State Cyclones
 Doug Dickey, former head coach for the Tennessee Volunteers and Florida Gators
 Chan Gailey, former head coach for the Buffalo Bills, Dallas Cowboys, and Georgia Tech Yellow Jackets
 Fred Goldsmith, former head coach for the Duke Blue Devils and the Rice Owls
 Todd Haley, former head coach of the Kansas City Chiefs
 Kim Helton, former head coach for the Houston Cougars
 Marcelino Huerta, former head coach of the Tampa Spartans, the Wichita State Shockers and Parsons College
 Lindy Infante, former head coach for the Green Bay Packers and Indianapolis Colts
 Mike Mularkey, former head coach for the Tennessee Titans, Jacksonville Jaguars and Buffalo Bills
 Steve Spurrier, former head coach for the Florida Gators, South Carolina Gamecocks, Duke Blue Devils, Tampa Bay Bandits, and Washington Redskins
 Kay Stephenson, former head coach of the Buffalo Bills
 Charlie Strong, former head coach for the South Florida Bulls, former head coach for the Texas Longhorns and Louisville Cardinals, former interim head coach for the Florida Gators
 John Symank, former head coach for the Northern Arizona Lumberjacks and Texas–Arlington Mavericks
 Charlie Tate, former head coach for the Miami Hurricanes

Musicians

 Gene Adkinson, baritone for the band The Dream Weavers
 Stanley Benton, hip-hop artist who goes by the name Stat Quo
 Bob Bryar, drummer for the band My Chemical Romance
 Wade Buff, lead singer for The Dream Weavers
 Brian Carpenter, composer, multi-instrumentalist, singer, songwriter, and radio producer
 Easton Corbin, country music artist
 Chris Demakes, co-founder and lead singer for Less than Jake
 Vinnie Fiorello, co-founder and drummer for Less than Jake
 Alejandro Manzano, musician, singer, and songwriter
 Fabian Manzano, guitarist, and songwriter
 James Melton, singer, actor, named to the Hollywood Walk of Fame
 Slack Season, alternative rock group formed by UOF alumni
 Stat Quo, rapper, degree in International Business and Economics
 Howard Stelzer, electronic composer
 Stephen Stills, member of bands CSNY and Buffalo Springfield
 Keni Thomas, country music singer
 Mel Tillis, singer, songwriter, and comedian
 Johnny Tillotson, singer, and songwriter
 Peter Traub, composer of electronic and acoustic music
 Toby Turner, singer, actor, comedian, and internet personality
 T. Edward Vives, current musical director for the Los Alamos Community Winds

Pageantry

 Kristen Berset, Miss Florida USA for 2004, finalist for Miss USA pageant, current model
 Michelyn Butler, Miss Wisconsin USA for 2008
 Ann Gloria Daniel, Miss Florida for 1954
 Julie Donaldson, Miss Florida USA for 2001
 Elizabeth Fechtel, Miss America's Outstanding Teen for 2012
 Mary Katherine Fechtel, Miss Florida for 2015
 Myrrhanda Jones, Miss Florida for 2013
 Allison Kreiger, Miss Florida for 2006
 Kristin Ludecke, Miss Florida for 1995, and Miss Florida USA for 2000
 Laura McKeeman Rutledge, Miss Florida for 2012 and host of SEC Nation
 Molly Pesce, Miss Florida 1986, actress
 Jaclyn Raulerson, Miss Florida for 2010
 Nancy Stafford, Miss Florida for 1976, actress
 Mari Wilensky, Miss Florida for 2005, top-ten finalist at Miss America pageant
 Melissa Witek, Miss Florida USA for 2005, top-five finalist at Miss USA pageant, and contestant on NBC's Treasure Hunters

Poets

 Deborah Ager, poet, co-founder of 32 Poems literary magazine
 Joe Bolton, regional poet who wrote Days of Summer Gone, The Last Nostalgia Poems, and Breckinridge County Suite
 Geoffrey Brock, poet, poetry translator, and professor at the University of Arkansas
 Stephen Corey, poet and current editor of The Georgia Review
 Geri Doran, poet, professor of creative writing at the University of Oregon, author of Resin and Sanderlings
 Robert Bernard Hass, poet, professor of English at Edinboro University, author of Going by Contraries: Robert Frost's Conflict With Science and Counting Thunder
 Randall Mann, poet, author of Breakfast with Thom Gunn and Complaint in the Garden, recipient of Kenyon Prize
 Orlando Ricardo Menes, Cuban-American poet and teacher at the University of Notre Dame
 C. Dale Young, award-winning poet and short-story writer, oncologist, professor of creative writing at Warren Wilson College

Reporters, correspondents, and newscasters

 Stephanie Abrams, reporter for The Weather Channel
 Erin Andrews, reporter for Fox Sports and formerly ESPN
 Edward Aschoff, reporter for ESPN
 Sharyl Attkisson, former correspondent for CBS News
 Jackie Bange, current anchor with WGN-TV
 Kristen Berset, current anchor for WBFF
 Ernie Bjorkman, former anchor for KWGN-TV in Denver, and winner of two Emmy Awards
 Pam Bondi, correspondent for Fox News
 Jenn Brown, two-time Emmy Award-winning sports reporter for ESPN
 Kavita Channe, television and radio personality, known for appearing on Paradise Hotel
 Linda Church, morning weather anchor for WPIX in New York
 Bob Collins, former broadcaster for WGN-TV in Chicago
 Mark Curtis, current anchor for WLNE-TV
 H. G. Davis Jr., Pulitzer Prize-winning reporter
 Jamie Dupree, correspondent for Cox Broadcasting Washington News Bureau
 David Finkel, journalist and Pulitzer Prize-winning reporter for The Washington Post
 Kristin Harmel, novelist and reporter for People magazine
 Dan Hicken, sports director and anchor for WTLV/WJXX in Jacksonville, Florida
 Susan Hutchison, former anchor for KIRO-TV in Seattle, Washington
 Ian D. Johnson, current Berlin bureau chief for The Wall Street Journal, Pulitzer Prize-winner
 Jennifer Lopez, meteorologist for The Weather Channel
 Jamie McIntyre, news anchor for NPR's All Things Considered and former senior Pentagon correspondent for CNN
 Heather Mitts, former reporter for ABC/ESPN, three-time Olympic gold medalist with the USWNT, professional soccer player
 Jeff Nesmith, journalist and Pulitzer Prize-winner
 Howard Norton, won the Pulitzer Prize in 1947 for his reporting
 Elizabeth Prann, current reporter with the Fox News Channel
 Raul Ramirez, 1969 editor of Florida Alligator; print and broadcast journalist and executive, educator; activist in promoting independent reporting and diversity in the profession
 Laura Rutledge, anchor/reporter with SEC Network/ESPN
 Forrest Sawyer, current anchorman for ABC News and winner of the George Foster Peabody Award, five National Emmy Awards, two Edward Murrow Awards, and an Associated Press Award
 Joe Scarborough, current MSNBC talk show host, and former US Representative
 Sara Sidner, international correspondent with CNN
 Alison Starling, Emmy Award-winning anchor for ABC affiliate WJLA-TV News in Washington, D.C.
 Hal Suit, television broadcaster, formerly with WSB-TV in Atlanta; 1970 Republican gubernatorial nominee in Georgia, lost to Jimmy Carter

Sportcasters

 Red Barber, long-time radio sportscaster for the Brooklyn Dodgers and New York Yankees
 Lomas Brown, television commentator for ESPN and former NFL offensive tackle
 Kevin Carter, television commentator for ESPN and former NFL defensive end
 Bob Collins, broadcaster
 Cris Collinsworth, television commentator for HBO's Inside the NFL and Fox NFL Sunday, and former NFL wide receiver
 Gene Deckerhoff, current radio announcer for the Tampa Bay Buccaneers and Florida State Seminoles, and formerly for the Arena Football League
 Julie Donaldson, former sports commentator for WHDH-TV
 Ferdie Pacheco, former Showtime boxing analyst, and personal physician to Muhammad Ali
 Jesse Palmer, television commentator for ESPN/ABC, NFL Insider for TSN, former NFL quarterback, and star of ABC's The Bachelor
 Elfi Schlegel-Dunn, gymnastics and sports commentator for NBC Sports
 Lauren Shehadi, current sportscaster for MLB Network
 Emmitt Smith, television commentator for ESPN, Pro Football Hall of Fame former NFL running back, and NFL career rushing yards leader
 Chris Snode, Olympic diving commentator for BBC and EuroSport since 1988
 Tim Tebow, television commentator for SEC Network/ESPN and former NFL quarterback
 Laura Rutledge, television commentator for SEC Network/ESPN Get Up! (TV program), First Take (talk show), and SportsCenter host

Sports

Baseball

Basketball (NBA)

Overseas (Non NBA)

 Kerry Blackshear Jr. (born 1997), basketball player in the Israeli Basketball Premier League
John Egbunu (born 1994), Nigerian-born American basketball player for Hapoel Jerusalem of the Israeli Basketball Premier League
Jalen Hudson (born 1996), basketball player in the Israeli Basketball Premier League
Kenny Kadji (born 1988), Cameroonian basketball player in the Israeli Basketball Premier League
Egor Koulechov (born 1994), Israeli-Russian professional basketball player for Israeli team Ironi Nahariya
Casey Prather (born 1991), basketball player in the Israeli Basketball Premier League
 Nimrod Tishman (born 1991), Israeli basketball player in the Israeli Basketball Premier League
 Alex Tyus (born 1988), American-Israeli professional basketball player, also plays for the Israeli national basketball team
Scottie Wilbekin (born 1993), basketball player for Maccabi Tel Aviv of the Israeli Premier League and the EuroLeague

eSports

Juan DeBiedma, #1 ranked Super Smash Bros. Melee player, known as Hungrybox

Football

Golf

Tennis

Olympians

See also 

 List of Levin College of Law graduates
 List of University of Florida Athletic Hall of Fame members
 List of University of Florida faculty and administrators
 List of University of Florida honorary degree recipients
 List of University of Florida presidents
 University of Florida Board of Trustees

References 

People
University of Florida alumni